Berzo may refer to the following communes in Italy:

Berzo Demo, in the province of Brescia
Berzo Inferiore, in the province of Brescia
Berzo San Fermo, in the province of Bergamo